Michael Collins Ajereh (born 26 November 1982), known professionally as Don Jazzy, is a Nigerian record producer. He is the founder and the CEO of Mavin Records. Don Jazzy was co-owner of the now-defunct Mo' Hits Records record label with D'banj.

Early life and education 
Don Jazzy was born Micheal Collins Ajereh in Umuahia, Abia State, on 26 November 1982, the son of Collins Enebeli Ajereh and Mrs Ajereh. His father is from Isoko in Delta State. His mother is an Igbo princess from Abia state and his father is a member of the Isoko people.

Ajereh's family moved to Ajegunle, Lagos, where Don Jazzy was raised. He was educated at the co-educational high school, Federal Government College Lagos. Don Jazzy found an interest in music early in life and at age 12, began to play the bass guitar and piano. He also gained knowledge of traditional and percussion instruments. Don Jazzy enrolled in business management and studied at the Ambrose Alli University, Ekpoma, Edo state.

In 2000, Jazzy's uncle invited him to play the drums for a local church in London and that was his first visit to London. Don Jazzy gained employment at McDonald's as a security guard. He continued his interest in music, associating with Solek, JJC Skillz, Kas, Jesse Jagz, The 419 Squad and D'Banj.

Career

Mo' Hits records and GOOD music 
In 2004, Don Jazzy collaborated with D'Banj to form Mo' Hits Records. In the next two years, Don Jazzy produced the albums No Long Thing and Rundown/Funk You Up. Around this time, Don Jazzy developed a recognisable introduction, "It's Don Jazzy Again!".

In 2008, Don Jazzy was credited in the production of The Entertainer by D'Banj. He also contributed to the production of Wande Coal's Mushin 2 MoHits, an album that was described as one of the best albums to ever come out of Nigeria.

In 2011, Don Jazzy was employed by Kanye West as a producer at Very Good Beatz. Don Jazzy worked with Jay-Z and Kanye West on the production of Lift Off, featuring Beyoncé on the album Watch The Throne which was released on 8 August 2011.
In March 2012, Don Jazzy and D'Banj confirmed their breakup citing artistic differences.

Mavin Records 
On 7 May 2012, Don Jazzy announced a new record label, Mavin Records. He said, "I see Mavin Records being the power house of music in Africa in the shortest possible time." On 8 May 2012, he released an album featuring the artists signed to his label. The songs on the album included: "Amarachi", "Forever", "Oma Ga", "Take Banana and Chocolate", "YOLO" and the anthem "I'm a MAVIN". Mavin records signed the vocalist, Tiwa Savage. Don Jazzy built a social network platform called "Marvin League" to complement and market his label.

On 5 November 2013, Ajereh had conflict with an artist, Wande Coal who left the label two days later.

In September 2014, Ajereh produced a Nigerian social activist song with Reekado Banks and Di'Ja called "Arise".

At the Headies Awards 2015, Ajereh argued with Olamide. The two disagreed about who should have won the "Next Rated" award. Lil Kesh of YBNL records lost to Reekado Banks, Ajereh's artist. The winner of the award received a car. Apologies on both sides were posted afterwards.

After Reekado Banks departure from the Mavin Records label, Don Jazzy said he is still part of the family and wished him nothing but success in his career as he thanked him for the time spent with Mavin Records.

In 2019, he signed Rema and later went on in 2020 to sign Ayra Starr into Mavins Record Label. In 2021, he announced a new artist, Magixx.

On 7 April 2021, he revealed why he never signed Davido.

Film appearance 
In 2012, Don Jazzy appeared in Moses Inwang's movie The Last 3 Digits in Nollywood. Inwang also cast Ali Baba, A.Y., Nonso Diobi and Dr SID.

Awards 
 Nigerian Music Awards (2006) – Producer of the Year.
 Nigerian Entertainment Awards (2007) – Music Producer of the Year.
 The Headies 2011 – Producer of the Year for Over The Moon, Mr Endowed and Pop Something
 The Headies 2014 – Producer of the Year for Dorobucci
 City People Entertainment Award (2015) – special recognition award.
 The Beatz Award TM (2019) – New Discovery Producer.

Production discography

Albums 
 D'banj – No Long Thing (2005)
 D'banj – RunDown Funk U Up (2006)
 D'banj – The Entertainer (2008)
 Mo' Hits All Stars – Curriculum Vitae (2007)
 Anaconda	3:34
 Booty Call 	5:13
 Close To You	3:43
 Hey Girl	5:08
 Igbe Mi	5:40
 Masquerade	4:02
 No Long Thing	3:15
 Ololufe (Club Mix)	4:21
 Stop The Violence 	6:37
 Why Me (Remix)	5:16
 Jasi	2:50

 Wande Coal – Mushin2Mohits (2008)
 I Know U Like It	3:10
 You Bad	4:05
 Se Na Like This	4:12
 Kiss Ur Hands	3:54
 Confused 	4:20
 Se Ope	3:22
 Now It's All Gone 	4:24
 Bumper 2 Bumper	3:51
 Who Born The Maga (featuring Kay Switch) 4:37
 That's Wots Up 	4:42
 Bananas	3:59
 Taboo	4:24
 Jehovah 	4:02
 Ololufe 	4:56
 Ten Ten	3:50
 My Grind	4:48
 Been long you saw me
 Private trips
 Go low 3:50
 The kick 4:12
 Rotate 3:51

 Dr SID Turning Point (2010)
 When This Song Comes On
 Over the Moon (feat. K-Switch)
 Something About You
 Winchi Winchi (feat. Wande Coal)
 Pop something (feat. D'Banj)
 a Mi Jo (feat. Ikechukwu, M.I & eLDee)
 Baby
 E Je Ka Jo (feat. D'Banj)
 Pillow
 Something About You (Silva Stone Remix)
 Winchi Winchi (feat. Wande Coal, Sway DaSafo & Dotstar)

 MAVINS – Solar Plexus "MAVIN Records" (2012)
 Intro by MAVINS (Michael Ajereh, Sidney Esiri)
 I'm A MAVIN by MAVINS  (Michael Ajereh, Tiwatope Savage, Sidney Esiri, Wande Ojosipe, Charles Enebeli)
 Oma Ga by Tiwa Savage (Michael Ajereh, Tiwatope Savage, Sidney Esiri, Wande Ojosipe)
 YOLO by Dr SID (Michael Ajereh, Sidney Esiri)
 See Me Ri by Wande Coal (Michael Ajereh, Sidney Esiri, Wande Ojisipe, Towa Ojosipe)
 Take Banana by D'PRINCE (Michael Ajereh, Charles Enebeli)
 CPR by Dr SID (Michael Ajereh, Sidney Esiri)
 Forever by Wande Coal  (Michael Ajereh, Sidney Esiri, Wande Ojosipe, Towa Ojosipe)
 Why You Over There by D'PRINCE (Michael Ajereh, Charles Enebeli)
 Chocolate by Dr SID (Michael Ajereh, Sidney Esiri, Charles Enebeli)
 Pretty Girls by Wande Coal  (Michael Ajereh, Wande Ojosipe)
 Amarachi by D'PRINCE  (Michael Ajereh, Charles Enebeli)
 Outro by MAVINS  (Michael Ajereh, Sidney Esiri)

Singles with Mo' Hits artists 
 D'Prince
 Omoba
 I like What I See (feat. Wande Coal)
 Ooze (feat. D'Banj)
 Give It To me (feat. D'Banj)

 D'banj
 Tongolo (2005)
 Soko (2005)
 Mobolowowon (2005)
 Why Me (2006)
 Run Down (2006)
 Kimon (2008)
 Olorun Maje (2008)
 Gbono Feli (2008)
 Entertainer (2008)
 Suddenly (2008)
 Fall in Love (2008)
 Igwe (2008)
 Mr Endowed (2010)
 I do This
 Scape Goat (2010)
 ashanti (2010)
 Mr Endowed (Remix) (feat. Snoop Dogg) (2010)
 Oliver Twist (2011)

 Wande Coal
 Bumper 2 Bumper
 You Bad
 Kiss Your Hand
 Who Born the Maga
 Been Long You Saw Me  (feat. Don Jazzy) (2011)
 Go Low (2011)

Dr SID
 Something About You (2009)
 Winchi winchi (2009)
 Pop Something(feat. D'Banj)
 Over The Moon (2010)
 Chocolate
 Y.O.L.O
 C.P.R
 Afefe
 Chocolate West African Remix (feat. Ice Prince Sarkodie Elom Adablah Lynxxx)
 Chocolate East African Remix (feat. Musik Maestro)
 Lady Don Dada
 Love Mine
 Talented
 Baby Tornado
 Baby Tornado Remix (feat. Alexandra burke)
 Surulere (feat. Don Jazzy)

Mo'Hits Allstars
 Ten Ten

Singles with other artists 
 Darey – Escalade part 2
 Darey – Stroke Me
 Shank – Never Felt
 Naeto C – Asewo
 Ikechukwu – Like You (feat. Wande Coal)
 Ikechukwu – Wind am well (feat. Don Jazzy and D'Banj)
 Ikechukwu – Do (feat. D'Banj)
 Ikechukwu – All on Me
 Ikechukwu – Critical  (feat. D'Banj)
 Ikechukwu – Now is the time (feat. Don Jazzy)
 Sauce Kid – Under G
 Kanye West & Jay-Z – Lift Off (feat. Beyoncé)
 Weird MC – Ijoya
Burna Boy – Question (2021)
Jahborne - Wayo

Personal life 
Don Jazzy married Michelle Jackson in 2003. He claims they both had issues as a result of his ambitious nature and subsequently divorced about two years after they wed. However, he doesn't plan to marry again soon because he fears his love and dedication to music will hurt someone's feelings again.

Ajereh has a younger brother, D'Prince.

In July 2022, he announced the death of his mother via his Instagram page.

In what will come across as a really heart-breaking development, the legendary Nigerian beatmaker, Don Jazzy and his brother, D’Prince, a popular Nigerian singer have lost their mother to cancer.

Membership of Cherubim and Seraphim Church 
Mavin Records boss, Don Jazzy has confirmed he is still a committed member of the white garment church called ‘Cherubim and Seraphim’. Over the weekend, the respected music producer was honoured by the Eternal Sacred Order of the Cherubim & Seraphim church worldwide and later, pictures of his childhood cladded in the church’s garment hit the internet. Before now, not many knew the multiple award-winning beat maker was a member of the church and this was why many were surprised. A surprised fan of Don Jazzy asked him, ‘So you have been attending Cele (a name commonly used for white garment churches in Nigeria)? and the Mavin boss responded, ‘and then? I still attend the church till now. But get it right, it’s Cherubim & Seraphim [not Cele].’

References 
Why I did not sign Davido – Don Jazzy finally reveals. Matter Arising Retrieved 25 January 2023

1982 births
Living people
Ambrose Alli University alumni
English-language singers from Nigeria
Nigerian hip hop record producers
Nigerian hip hop singers
Nigerian music industry executives
Nigerian singer-songwriters
The Headies winners
Yoruba-language singers
21st-century Nigerian singers
Nigerian TikTokers
Musicians from Umuahia